Mićunovo is a village in Serbia. It is situated in the Bačka Topola municipality, in the North Bačka District, Vojvodina province. The village has a Serb ethnic majority and its population numbering 516 people (2002 census).

Name
In Serbian the village is known as Mićunovo (Мићуново), in Hungarian as Karkatúr, and in Croatian as Mićunovo.

Historical population

1961: 267
1971: 283
1981: 304
1991: 524
2002: 516

References
Slobodan Ćurčić, Broj stanovnika Vojvodine, Novi Sad, 1996.

See also
List of places in Serbia
List of cities, towns and villages in Vojvodina

Places in Bačka